Mirela Rusu (born 5 March 1978 in Bacău, Romania) is a  retired Romanian aerobic gymnast. She won three world championship medals (two gold and one bronze) and five European championships medals (three gold and two silver).

References

External links
Federation Internationale de Gymnastique Profiles: Mirela Rusu

1978 births
Living people
Sportspeople from Bacău
Romanian aerobic gymnasts
Female aerobic gymnasts
Medalists at the Aerobic Gymnastics World Championships